The Waitara Railway Preservation Society is a society established in 1999 to operate a heritage railway over the former Waitara Industrial Line railway that operated between Lepperton and Waitara in the New Plymouth District of New Zealand's North Island.  The line had been closed that year after 124 years of operation, after the closure of the local AFFCO freezing works in the town.

The preserved line 
The preserved line begins at the northern end of the Lepperton Railway Yards (just past the main line turnout) and continues parallel to the Marton - New Plymouth Railway for a few hundred meters before turning right towards the Waiongana Stream. After crossing the stream the line runs to the former Waitara Road station in Brixton. The line continues from here towards Waitara, passing underneath State Highway 3 at Big Jim's Overpass. Finally, the line drops into the Waitara Valley and into the township of Waitara, finishing just before the Waitara River.

In Waitara, most of the infrastructure is gone with only the main line and one loop remaining in the yard. The former Tahora station has been relocated to Waitara Road, where the society's rolling stock is stored. The site of the Lepperton railway station & yard is still owned and operated by KiwiRail, where the station building was removed in 1994. 

The branch line has 8 level crossings along its length, all of which are protected by compulsory stop signs. Issues with these were raised in the community in 2004 as legally traffic has to stop even though trains seldom ran more than once a month. The Land Transport Safety Authority (now NZTA) would not allow Give Way signs and reinstating bells and lights had been reported as costing over $250,000 per crossing (almost the purchase price of the entire line in 1999) making installation unlikely for foreseeable future. Rail operations have become more frequent since then but motorists failing to stop for the societies trains is still an issue.

Operation 

Trains are run twice daily on the first and third Sundays of the month, departing from Waitara.  The trip takes 45 minutes return, including a stop at The Former Tahora Station on the return journey for refreshments.  The railway also offers charter services by arrangement.

Since around 2007, trains had only journeyed as far as the Waiongana River bridge due to the deterioration of the sleepers on the structure. In April 2014 the bridge was re-sleepered and maintenance completed on the main bridge structure (including removing the former Waitara town water pipes from the side). This has allowed trains to return to the entire branch line (and a proposed loop at the former Sentry Hill station site).

In 2019 the society entered into a lease to the Lepperton railway sidings (but not the main line and loop) which will allow locomotives to switch ends of the train. As part of this agreement, the society is building a new linking track to bypass the Kiwirails network which is under Centralised Traffic Control.

Rolling stock

Locomotives 

The Waitara Railway Preservation Society owns a number of diesel shunting locomotives, either operational or awaiting restoration. These include:

Former resident locomotives 
Locomotives formerly based at Waitara include:
FA 250  steam locomotive, built in 1892. Leased from the Waikato branch of the NZR&LS
Tr 164  diesel shunter, built in 1959. Now at F&DSRS in Feilding. Privately owned.

The WRPS's collection of rolling stock consists of both passenger carriages and freight wagons, and is either owned outright by the society or is leased from the Rail Heritage Trust of New Zealand. This includes:

Passenger Vehicles

Guards Vans

Goods Wagons

Buildings & Facilitates

Station Buildings 

None of the original station buildings remained when the line was purchased. Since the railway was purchased, new stations have been created. This has included relocating two historic station buildings, both former New Zealand Railways stations.

 Waitara Road's station building made up of the former Tahora & Waitōtara station buildings. The Tahora building is fully restored while the Waitōtara building is under restoration.
 The shelter at Magnolia glade is a former New Plymouth City Transport bus shelter.

Magnolia Glade 

Magnolia Glade is located just past Waitara Road station and is the site of over 200 new trees planted along the line, including a significant number of Magnolias. Trains are operated as part of the Taranaki Fringe Garden Festival each year while the trees are in bloom.

References

External links
Official website of the Waitara Railway Preservation Society

Heritage railways in New Zealand
Transport organisations based in New Zealand
Organizations established in 1999
Taranaki
1999 establishments in New Zealand